James Price may refer to:

Politics
James Hervey Price (1797–1882), Canadian attorney and political figure
James Hubert Price (1878–1943), American politician and governor
James Latimer Price (1840–1912), American Republican politician and judge in the U.S. state of Ohio
James Price (Australian politician) (1864–1910), Australian politician
James Price (of Monachty) (1571–?), Welsh MP
James Price (of Pilleth) (1571–1641), Welsh MP

Sports
James Price (cricketer) (born 1992), South African cricketer
James Price (footballer) (1896–1970), Scottish footballer who played as a defender
Jamie Price (born 1981), English footballer
James R. Price (1862–1929), American sports journalist and executive

Other
James Price (businessman) (1776–1840), American businessman in the U.S. state of Delaware
James Price (civil engineer) (1917–2005), Welsh civil engineer, mathematician and author 
James Price (chemist) (1752–1783), British chemist and alchemist
James Price (composer) (born 1959), Danish composer and conductor
James F. Price (1906–1994), American academic
James H. Price (academic), American academic
James Price (Acting), American Acting Coach

Places 
James Price Point, in Western Australia

See also 
Jim Price (disambiguation)